Acharya Rameshwar Jha (20th century) was an Indian traditional Sanskrit scholar and considered an authority on Nyaya, Vyakarana and Vedanta.  He later became an exponent of non dualistic shaivisim and is often credited with establishing and propagating Kashmir Shaivism in Varanasi.

Life
His spiritual experiences and deep understanding of ancient texts were spontaneously expressed in numerous Sanskrit verses. These were published as book Purnta Pratyabhijna and SamvitSwatantram,  as articles in Shiva Tatva Vimarsha and Tantra Agam Vishank of Sanmarg and are preserved in personal diaries and correspondences.

References

External links 
 Selected Writings of Acharya Rameshwar Jha 

Indian male writers
20th-century Hindu religious leaders
Indian Shaivite religious leaders
Kashmiri Shaivites
People from Bihar
Recipients of the Rashtrapati Award
20th-century Hindu philosophers and theologians
Advaitin philosophers
1981 deaths
Year of birth missing